Al-Qilijiyah Madrasa is a madrasah complex located between Al-Buzuriyah Souq and the Azm Palace inside the walled old city of Damascus, Syria.

See also
 Al-Firdaws Madrasa
 Al-Sultaniyah Madrasa
 Al-Zahiriyah Madrasa
 Khusruwiyah Mosque

References

Ayyubid architecture in Syria
Madrasas in Damascus
Buildings and structures inside the walled city of Damascus
1254 establishments in Asia
13th-century establishments in the Ayyubid Sultanate